Mark Hancock is a Canadian trade union activist who is currently the National President of the Canadian Union of Public Employees (CUPE).  He was elected as the sixth National President of CUPE on November 4, 2015. CUPE is the largest trade union in Canada with approximately 700,000 members.

Career
Hancock got his start with CUPE in 1984 and served as president CUPE Local 498, representing employees of the City of Port Coquitlam, a suburb of Vancouver, British Columbia for 15 years. Hancock was elected president of his local in 1993 and was subsequently elected to the executive board of CUPE British Columbia Division, where he served for a total of 12 years, initially as a General Vice-President, then as Secretary-Treasurer starting in 2005 and  finally as President of CUPE BC beginning in 2013.

Simultaneously, he served on the CUPE National Executive Board beginning in 2005 as Regional Vice-President for British Columbia. On November 4, 2016, Hancock was elected as the sixth National President of CUPE National after defeating the President of CUPE Ontario Fred Hahn at the biannual CUPE National Convention. In 2017, Hancock was re-elected for another two-year term at the CUPE National Convention in Toronto, as well as the 2019 National Convention in Montreal and the 2021 National Convention, originally scheduled to be held in Vancouver, however due to COVID-19 safety measures and concerns, was held virtually for attending delegates.

Hancock is an adamant supporter of Canada's New Democratic Party saying he is "100-per-cent committed" to supporting the federal NDP.

Hancock is a father of two and lives in Coquitlam, British Columbia.

References

Canadian Union of Public Employees people
Living people
New Democratic Party people
People from Port Coquitlam
Trade unionists from British Columbia
Year of birth missing (living people)